Reginald Clyde Helmer (22 April 1916 – 24 April 1945) was an Australian rules footballer who played for    Geelong and Melbourne in the Victorian Football League (VFL).

Family
The son of Nils Helmer (1882-1967), and Eva May Helmer (1887-1971), née Hill, Reginald Clyde Helmer was born at Mooroopna on 22 April 1916. He was the nephew of Reginald Valentine Hill, D.S.O., the cousin of Fred Hawking, and the uncle of Geelong footballer John Helmer.

He married Marjorie Mary Frances Gibson (1919-1983), later Mrs. Maurice Steeth, in 1944.

Football
A forward, Helmer could torpedo punt on either foot.

Geelong (VFL)
In 1937 he played a centre half-forward in the Geelong Second XVIII team that won the Second's premiership.

In 1938, just his second league season, topped Geelong's goalkicking with 74 goals. In a game that year against Fitzroy he kicked a career best eight goals.

Interstate Team (VFL)
On 29 July 1939 he played at centre half-forward for Victoria against South Australia.

Melbourne (VFL)
He crossed to Melbourne in 1942 but could only manage two games.

South Sydney Football Club (NSWFL)
In 1944 he played for the South Sydney Australian Football Club in the New South Wales Football League.

Military service
During World War II Helmer was a Temporary Warrant Officer in the Australian Army and lost his life in New Guinea after a bomb he was trying to defuse exploded.

Remembered
On 5 May 1945, a minute's silence was observed in Helmer's memory before the match between the South Sydney and RAAF teams at Trumper Park Oval in Paddington, New South Wales.

See also
 List of Victorian Football League players who died in active service

Footnotes

References

 Blake, Jim, "Who's Who in Football, No.6: Geelong", The Sporting Globe, (Saturday, 25 May 1940), p.6.
 Holmesby, Russell and Main, Jim (2007). The Encyclopedia of AFL Footballers. 7th ed. Melbourne: Bas Publishing.
 Main, J. & Allen, D., "Helmer, Clyde", pp.264-266 in Main, J. & Allen, D., Fallen – The Ultimate Heroes: Footballers Who Never Returned From War, Crown Content, (Melbourne), 2002. 
 World War Two Service Record: WO2 Reginald Clyde Helmer (VX130748), National Archives of Australia.
 World War Two Nominal Roll: WO2 Reginald Clyde Helmer (VX130748), Department of Veterans' Affairs.
 Roll of Honour Circular: WO2 Reginald Clyde Helmer (VX130748), Collection of the Australian War Memorial.
 Killed in Action, The Sporting Globe, (Wednesday, 2 May 1945), p.14.

External links
 
 
 Clyde Helmer, at Demonwiki.
 Clyde Helmer, at Boyles Football Photos.
 Geelong Seconds 1937, at Boyles Football Photos.

1916 births
1945 deaths
Australian military personnel killed in World War II
Australian rules footballers from Victoria (Australia)
Geelong Football Club players
Melbourne Football Club players
Mooroopna Football Club players
South Sydney Football Club players
Australian Army personnel of World War II
Military personnel from Victoria (Australia)